Syphon Filter is a third-person shooter stealth video game series developed by Bend Studio (formerly Eidetic) and published by Sony Computer Entertainment (previously 989 Studios), for PlayStation, PlayStation 2 and the PlayStation Portable. In the series, Syphon Filter is the name that is given to the mysterious biological weapon.

Games

Syphon Filter (1999)

The plot centers on special agents, Gabriel Logan and Lian Xing, who are tasked by the United States government to apprehend Erich Rhoemer, an international terrorist.

Syphon Filter 2 (2000)

The plot picks up immediately after where the previous Syphon Filter ended. Gabe sets out to cure the virus, whilst being targeted as a "terrorist" by the United States government.

Syphon Filter 3 (2001)

Gabe and his team are suspected of treason. Summoned to prove their innocence, the team recounts the incidents that led to this moment. In the background, Gabe moves to rid the world of Syphon Filter once and for all.

Syphon Filter: The Omega Strain (2004)

Gabe, now commander of a government agency, leads global investigation of viral outbreaks in order to stop a deadlier strain of the titular virus from emerging. Unlike previous games, the main protagonist is I.P.C.A. recruit Cobra, while Gabe and Lian Xing appear as supporting NPCs.

Syphon Filter: Dark Mirror (2006)

Following a mixed reception of The Omega Strain, Dark Mirror is a return to the series' roots. Gabe investigates a terrorist incident in an Alaskan oil refinery, only to discover a big conspiracy around the titular Dark Mirror. This is the first Syphon Filer title developed for PlayStation Portable. The PlayStation 2 port removed multiplayer and mature content, but restored the roll ability.

Syphon Filter: Logan's Shadow (2007)

Serving as a direct sequel to Dark Mirror, Gabe receives a mission to retrieve stolen military equipment from Somali pirates, while discovering that his partner, Lian Xing, could be a double agent.

References

External links

 
Sony Interactive Entertainment franchises
Spy video games
Stealth video games
Stealth video games by series
Third-person shooters
Video game franchises
Video games developed in the United States
Video games featuring female protagonists
Video game franchises introduced in 1999